Mitsui Rail Capital (MRC) is a railways rolling stock leasing company and part of Mitsui & Co based in Japan. Its main activities are the purchase and rental (or leasing) of railway freight cars and locomotives.

United States  
Mitsui Rail Capital, LLC (MRC) was established in June 1996 in the U.S. state of Illinois and has business offices in Chicago (Illinois) and Des Moines (Iowa). 

Unitrain MRC was acquired in 1997 specialising in coal transportation; the main activity of this organisation is the leasing of freight cars, particularly coal wagons. Furthermore, MRC is also involved in the management and maintenance of freight wagon fleets it operates including logistics services.

Latin America
Mitsui Rail Capital Latin America (Mitsui Rail Capital Participacões Ltda.) (MRCLA) was established in São Paulo (Brazil) in November 2004.

MRCLAs main area of activity is the rental of freight cars, particularly for iron ore and agricultural products. The company also has the intention of acquiring logistics centers, in particular ports and related trans-shipment centers in Germany.

Its main customers are the Brazilian freight railway companies América Latina Logística (ALL), MRS Logística, and EFVM and EFC, both subsidiaries of Vale S.A. (the ex-Companhia Vale do Rio Doce Group Vale).

Europe

Mitsui Rail Capital Europe BV (MRCE) was launched in October 2004 with the headquarters in Amsterdam in the Netherlands as a joint subsidiary of Mitsui & Co., Ltd.(Japan) and Mitsui & Co. Europe plc. (United Kingdom).

MRCE main activity is the leasing of locomotives in Europe for the now liberalised rail transport system - particularly to new private railway companies.

Dispolok

The company expanded in September 2006 with the acquisition of Siemens Dispolok (Munich), the operations of the two companies were merged after the acquisition with dispolok being renamed MRCE dispolok in 2008

Locomotives leased from the company carry a distinctive black gloss livery.

Rolling stock  
In 2007 the locomotive pool consisted of ~150 machines from Bombardier Transportation, Siemens Mobility and Vossloh Locomotives. 

The inventory of MRCE includes: 

Bombardier Traxx (BR 145, F140 AC, F140 AC2, F140 MS)
Siemens EuroSprinter (ES 64 F4) plus inherited Dispolok stock
Vossloh G1000 BB, G1206, G1700, G2000 
EMD JT42CWR (also known as "Class 66")

References

External links
Mitsui Rail company
MRCE dispolok company website
Official MRCE website

Rolling stock leasing companies
Mitsui & Co.